Lepanto was an Azio-class minelayer of the Italian Navy. She was reclassified as gunboat in 1934 and remained in Italian service in the far east from 1933 to 1943, when she was scuttled in  China, during World War II. She was then recovered by the Imperial Japanese Navy and taken into service as Okitsu, spending the remainder of the war escorting convoys. She was surrendered to the Republic of China after the end of the war and served for a further ten years with its navy as the Hsien Ning.

Italian Navy service (1927 – 1943)
After remaining inactive at the Italian naval base in Tianjin since 1940, Lepanto was scuttled at her moorings by her own crew on 9 September 1943, after Italy's surrender to the Allies.

Imperial Japanese Navy service (1943 – 1945)
By 1 March 1944 repairs were completed, and she was registered in the Imperial Japanese Navy, and renamed Okitsu. She was sent to Mitsubishi Heavy Industries to have her armament fitted, which was finished by 14 May.

Starting 5 June, she started escorting convoys in the Shanghai area. She was fitted with radar at the Sasebo Naval Arsenal in April the following year. On 17 July 1945, she shot down three North American P-51 Mustangs and one North American B-25 Mitchell at Shanghai.

On 15 September 1945, her crew surrendered to the Republic of China, being decommissioned on 30 September.

Republic of China Navy service (1945 – 1956)
In 1946, the vessel was renamed Hsien Ning. Her known career in the Republic of China Navy from that point was fairly uneventful, except for the capture of a British merchant ship in July 1950. Some time in 1956, she was decommissioned.

Gallery

Footnotes

Bibliography
, History of Pacific War Vol. 51, The true histories of the Imperial Japanese Vessels Part 2, Gakken (Japan), June 2002, 
Ships of the World special issue Vol. 47, Auxiliary Vessels of the Imperial Japanese Navy, (Japan), March 1997
The Maru Special, Japanese Naval Vessels No. 45, Japanese gunboats,  (Japan), November 1980

External links
 Lepanto (1927) Marina Militare website

Minelayers of the Regia Marina
1927 ships
World War II minelayers of Italy
Naval ships captured by Japan during World War II
Maritime incidents in September 1943
Ships built in Ancona
Mine warfare vessels of the Republic of China Navy
World War II minelayers of Japan